Darar Djama Aboubaker (born 27 December 1989) is a Djiboutian footballer.

External links 
 

1989 births
Living people
Association football forwards
Djiboutian footballers
Djibouti international footballers